The lira was the currency of the Papal States between 1866 and 1870.

History

In 1866 Pope Pius IX, whose temporal domain had been reduced to only the province of Latium, decided to join the Latin Monetary Union. A new currency, the lira, was introduced with the same value of the French franc and the Italian lira. It replaced the scudo at a rate of 5.375lire = 1scudo : the rate was calculated thanks to the silver value of the old scudo (26.9grams of 0.900 fine silver) and the new lira (5grams of 0.900 fine silver). However, some time after joining the Union, the Pope's treasurer, Giacomo Antonelli, devalued the purity of the Papal silver coins from 900/1000 to 835/1000,  causing big problems for the Union, which later was forced to adopt the new standard. With the annexation of the Papal States to Italy in 1870, the Papal lira was replaced by the Italian lira at par.

The lira was subdivided into 100 centesimi and, differently from the other currencies of the union, into 20 soldi. However, all denomination in soldo had an equivalence in cents.

Coins

Copper coins were issued in denominations of c.1, s., (c.), s.1 (c.5), s.2 (c.10) and s.4 (c.20), with silver s.5 (c.25) and s.10 (c.50), 1, 2,  and 5 lire, and gold 5, 10, 20, 50 and 100 lire.

See also

 Vatican lira
 Vatican euro coins

References

External links

Franc
Modern obsolete currencies
Lira
Currencies of Italy
Currencies of Vatican City
1866 establishments in the Papal States
1870 disestablishments in the Papal States
19th-century economic history